Threat assessment is the practice of determining the credibility and seriousness of a potential threat, as well as the probability that the threat will become a reality. Threat assessment is separate to the more established practice of violence-risk assessment, which attempts to predict an individual's general capacity and tendency to react to situations violently. Instead, threat assessment aims to interrupt people on a pathway to commit "predatory or instrumental violence, the type of behavior associated with targeted attacks," according to J. Reid Meloy, PhD, co-editor of the International Handbook of Threat Assessment. "Predatory and affective violence are largely distinctive modes of violence."

Threat assessments are commonly conducted by government agencies such as FBI and CIA on a national security scale. However, many private companies can also offer threat assessment capabilities targeted towards the needs of individuals and businesses.

Components 
Threat assessment involves several major components(1-4):
 Identification: Identifying threats to commit a potential unfavorable act. Authorities must also convey that tips will be dealt with carefully and responsibly; understanding that people who report threats may fear that they could wrongly implicate someone else, entangle themselves in trouble or both. 
 Initial Assessment: Determining the seriousness of the threat. This could involve security professionals, school counselors, supervisors or human resources managers talking to the person of concern and his or her peers and supervisors, as well as looking to social media sites, to better assess whether or not the person is planning violence, as well as to assess the subject's current life situations. 
 Case Management: Developing intervention plans to address the underlying issue, such as bullying, anxiety and/or depression, which mental health professionals are trained to handle. In the cases where the assessment reveals a true threat, law enforcement and other professionals develop a plan to disrupt the potential pathway to violence. In the short term, that could mean alerting potential victims and restraining the subject. In the long term, it means to redirect someone who might be on such a path.
 Follow-up Assessment and Safety Planning: Depending on the threat, explicit or implied, past history or current threats of violence, according to Joseph A. Davis, Ph.D., author and editor of "Stalking Crimes and Victim Protection" (Taylor-Francis/Routledge Press, 2001, 538 pages), the person determining the viability of a threat needs to critically evaluate the ongoing nature of the threat by continuously looking at the R-S-I-F indicators. That is, the RECENCY-SEVERITY-INTENSITY-FREQUENCY aspects of the threat by the threatener [6]

Areas of need 
Threat assessment is relevant to many businesses and other venues, including schools. Threat assessment professionals, who include psychologists and law enforcement agents, work to identify and help potential offenders, guiding students to overcome underlying sources of anger, hopelessness or despair. These feelings can increase a student's risk of suicide, alcohol and drug use, physical abuse, dropping out and criminal activity. Threat assessment also applies to risk management. Information security risk managers often perform a threat assessment before developing a plan to mitigate those threats.

Per a Senator King hearing in 2022, a top U.S. military officer was reprimanded by Senator King, the chairman of the committee, because the threat assessment surrounding the Russian conflict with Ukraine was not anywhere near the actual outcome.  Senator King commented that additional arms could have been sent by the U.S. government more quickly to aid Ukraine defense if a more reliable assessment would have been performed.

References

Impact assessment
Probability assessment
Hazard analysis
Intelligence assessment